Kliestow is an Ortsteil of Frankfurt (Oder), Germany, with a population of 1,194.

Kliestow is approx.  east of Berlin.

External links 
 http://www.kliestow.de/

Frankfurt (Oder)